Afyonkarahisar Province, often shortened to Afyon Province, is a province in western Turkey.

Adjacent provinces are Kütahya to the northwest, Uşak to the west, Denizli to the southwest, Burdur to the south, Isparta to the southeast, Konya to the east, and Eskişehir to the north. The provincial capital is Afyonkarahisar. It covers an area of 14,230 km², and the population is about 744,179 as of 2021.

Districts

Afyonkarahisar province is divided into 18 districts:

 Afyonkarahisar
 Başmakçı
 Bayat
 Bolvadin
 Çay
 Çobanlar
 Dazkırı
 Dinar
 Emirdağ
 Evciler
 Hocalar
 İhsaniye
 İscehisar
 Kızılören
 Sandıklı
 Sinanpaşa
 Sultandağı
 Şuhut

Population

The population of Afyonkarahisar Province is majority Turkish and Muslim of the Sunni sect.

Health	
Air pollution is a chronic problem in the province.

Gallery

References

External links

 Afyonkarahisar governor's official website 
 Afyonkarahisar municipality's official website 
 Pictures of the capital of Afyonkarahisar province. With old Fortress of Opium, nice old centre. 
 https://web.archive.org/web/20060622072815/http://www.turkeyforecast.com/weather/afyon/